2022 in sailing describes the year's events in sailing

Death of Notable Sailor
 Jeremy Rogers MBE (1937-2022) - Yacht Designer

Major Offshore Sailing
 Rolex 2022 Sydney to Hobart Yacht Race
 Sevenstar RORC Round Britain and Ireland Race
 Rolex Middle Sea Race
 Both the middle sea race and Sydney Hobart were decided by the jury.

Major Oceanic Races
 2022 Route du Rhum

World Championships (Incomplete)

References

External links
Sailing.org Calendar

 
Sailing by year